"Wid Out Ya" is a song performed by Polish band Blog 27 from their 2005 debut album LOL. It was released as the third single from the album in 2006.

The song could not chart in Blog 27's home country where there was no official singles sales chart at that time, but it was popular there and did enter a number of radio and magazines charts based on the fans' votes. It also entered official singles charts in Austria and Germany.

Music video
The music video begins with Ala and Tola walking down an empty car park, accompanied by a group of girls. They approach and confront a group of boys, singing the song at them. The scene is interspersed with live footage from Blog 27's concert in Hamburg, Germany on 8 March 2006. The car park scenes were filmed in April and the final video premiered in May 2006.

Track listing
CD maxi single
"Wid Out Ya" (New Edit) – 3:03
"Wid Out Ya" (Extended Version) – 4:17
"Wid Out Ya" (Karaoke Version) – 3:01
+ "Wid Out Ya" (The Video)

Digital download
"Wid Out Ya" (New Edit) – 3:03
"Wid Out Ya" (Extended Version) – 4:17
"Wid Out Ya" (Karaoke Version) – 3:01

Chart performance

References

2005 songs
2006 singles
Blog 27 songs